Religious Committee for the ERA was an American women's rights organization active in the late 1970s and early 1980s that advocated for the ratification of the Equal Rights Amendment (ERA).

Overview 
The Religious Committee for the ERA was an organization of faith based feminists who planned a series of events to raise awareness of the need for an Equal Rights Amendment to the U.S. Constitution. The organization had eight founders. The organization included Catholics, Jewish supporters, Quakers, Presbyterians and many others from a wide variety of faith traditions. After the ERA failed to pass in June 1982, the organization changed its name to Religious Network for Equality of Women. They were also known as Renew.

Timeline of political activity 

 1978: People of Faith for ERA: Days of Prayer and Action
 1980: Inter-religious Lobby Day
 1982: National Prayer Vigil in Washington, D.C.
 1982: On June 30, members of The Religious Committee for the ERA burned copies of laws that discriminated against women in front of the National archives.

Members 

 Louise Bowman
 Marian Coger
 Mrs. C.L. Dillard
 Theodore Hesburgh
 Joan M. Martin
 Abigail McCarthy
 Rev. Delores Moss
 Eleanor R. Schwartz
 Natalie Tackett
 Sister Mary Luke Tobin
 Sister Marjorie Tuite
 Margaret Wilkins

Affiliated organizations 

 American Baptist Women
 Catholics Act for ERA
 Church Women United
 Las Hermanas
 Leadership Conference of Women Religious
 National Assembly of Women Religious
 National Coalition of American Nuns
 Sisters of Loretto
 St. Joan's International Alliance

References 

Catholic feminists
Catholic feminism
Jewish feminism
Women's rights organizations
Equal Rights Amendment organizations